David Rudyard Williams  (born 1954 in Aruba) is the Florence Sprague Norman and Laura Smart Norman Professor of Public Health at the Harvard School of Public Health, as well as a Professor of African and African American Studies and of Sociology at Harvard University.

Education
Originally educated in theology and ministry at Caribbean Union College and Andrews University, Williams then studied public health and sociology. Williams holds a Master of Public Health from Loma Linda University and an MA and PhD in sociology from the University of Michigan.

Career
From 1986-1992, Williams taught at Yale University, where he held appointments in both sociology and public health.
In 1992 Williams joined the faculty of the University of Michigan, where his positions included Harold Cruse Collegiate Professor of Sociology, a senior research scientist at the Institute of Social Research, and a Professor of Epidemiology in the School of Public Health.

In 2006 Williams joined Harvard as the Norman Professor of Public Health.
Williams was a senior research advisor for the 2008 PBS documentary series "Unnatural Causes: Is Inequality Making Us Sick". His 2016 TED Talk entitled "How Racism Makes Us Sick" has been translated into 18 languages and has been viewed over 1 million times.

Research
Williams' research focuses on how social factors such as education, income, and race affect physical and mental health. He is also known for his research on the health effects of racial discrimination.

Honors and awards
In 2001, Williams was elected a member of the Institute of Medicine (later the National Academy of Medicine). In 2007, he became a member of the American Academy of Arts and Sciences. He is also a member of the American Sociological Association, the American Public Health Association, and the American Psychological Association.  In 2019, he became a member of the National Academy of Sciences.

In 2009, Williams was named the most highly cited black scholar in the social sciences by the Journal of Blacks in Higher Education.
He was one of the world's most influential scientific minds as listed by Thomson Reuters in 2015.

In 2004, Williams was a recipient of one of the inaugural Decade of Behavior Research Awards from the American Psychological Association. In 2011, he received the Leo G. Reeder Award for Distinguished Contributions to Medical Sociology from the American Sociological Association. In 2013, Williams received the Stephen Smith Award for Distinguished Contributions in Public Health, New York Academy of Medicine. In 2014, he was the recipient of the Lemuel Shattuck Award for Significant Contributions to the Field of Public Health, awarded by the Massachusetts Public Health Association.  In 2015, he received the Distinguished Leadership in Psychology Award from the American Psychological Association. In 2017, he was the recipient of the Leonard I. Pearlin Award for Distinguished Contributions to the Sociological Study of Mental Health.

References

1954 births
Living people
Harvard School of Public Health faculty
University of the Southern Caribbean alumni
Andrews University alumni
Loma Linda University alumni
University of Michigan alumni
American sociologists
American social psychologists
Medical sociologists
Yale University faculty
University of Michigan faculty
Members of the National Academy of Medicine
Members of the United States National Academy of Sciences
American Seventh-day Adventists
Seventh-day Adventists in health science
African-American social scientists
African-American male writers
20th-century African-American scientists
21st-century African-American scientists
African-American Christians
Aruban people of African descent
Aruban emigrants to the United States
Aruban Christians
Aruban academics
Saint Lucian people of African descent
Saint Lucian emigrants to the United States
Saint Lucian Christians
Saint Lucian educators
Recipients of the Order of Saint Lucia